Dangerfield is an English surname, originally from a Norman name d'Angerville, after one of several places in northern France called Angerville.
Notable people with the surname include:

Chris Dangerfield, (born 1955), English football player
Chris Dangerfield, (born 1972), storyteller, comedian, YouTuber
Crystal Dangerfield (born 1998), Minnesota Lynx point guard
Fyfe Dangerfield (born 1980), English songwriter and musician with Guillemots
 Jordan Dangerfield (born 1990), American NFL football player
Joseph Dangerfield (born 1977), American musician
George Dangerfield (1904–1986), English-American journalist
Gordon Dangerfield (born 1885), Australian football player
Grahame Dangerfield (died 2018), British naturalist
Patrick Dangerfield (born 1990), Australian football player
Peter Dangerfield, English anatomist
Rodney Dangerfield (1921–2004), American comedian
Stuart Dangerfield (born 1971), English racing cyclist
Thomas Dangerfield (1650–1685), English conspirator

See also
 John E. P. Daingerfield, hostage during John Brown's raid on Harpers Ferry
Dangerfield (TV series), a British television series
Rover Dangerfield, an animated feature film
Dangerfield Newby (1815–1859), American former slave who followed John Brown
Dangerfield Talbert (1878–1914), American baseball player
Daingerfield, Texas, a town and the namesake of a traditional American fiddle tune
Dangerfield's, a comedy club in New York City
The Dangerfields, a band from Northern Ireland